Mitch MacDonald (born October 22, 1985) is a Canadian singer who was runner-up in season 6 of the reality series Canadian Idol.

Early life
MacDonald is from Port Hood, Nova Scotia on Cape Breton Island. He grew up in a family of seven siblings. He worked primarily as a carpenter before Idol. He cites his musical influences as including fellow Cape Bretoner Gordie Sampson. Bright Eyes is one of his favourite bands.

Canadian Idol
On Canadian Idol in 2008, MacDonald worked with such artists as Anne Murray, Simple Plan, Gavin Rossdale, and Tom Jones. During his run on Idol, he never appeared in the "bottom two" or "bottom three".

Music writer Martha Worboy described MacDonald's music as "tender, mostly acoustic renderings." He received accolades in particular for his rendition of Joel Plaskett's "Love This Town", which drew comparisons to Paul Simon from the judges. Nova Scotia Premier Rodney MacDonald, a musician himself before entering politics, said, "The key to his success throughout the contest was that he remained true to his musical roots."

Performances

Post-Idol
MacDonald toured Canada as part of the Top 3 Tour, with Theo Tams, and Drew Wright.

As of 2010, he continued to tour occasionally, both in his home province and in other parts of Canada, and he started work on an album.

References

1985 births
Living people
People from Inverness County, Nova Scotia
Canadian Idol participants
Musicians from Nova Scotia
Canadian male guitarists
21st-century Canadian guitarists
21st-century Canadian male singers